The German-Baltic Reform Party was a Baltic German political party in Latvia during the inter-war period. It contested elections as part of the Committee of the German Baltic Parties alliance. The party was led by Edwin Magnus.

History
The party was formed on 25 January 1920 by moderate rightwing-liberal sectors in the German minority. It was dissolved on 15 May 1934 following the self-coup by  Kārlis Ulmanis.

Members of the Saeima

References

Baltic-German people
Defunct political parties in Latvia
German diaspora political parties
Political parties established in 1920
1920 establishments in Latvia
Political parties disestablished in 1934
Political parties of minorities in Latvia